Menards is an American home improvement retail company headquartered in Eau Claire, Wisconsin. Menards is owned by founder John Menard Jr. through his privately held company, Menard, Inc. It has 351 stores in 15 states: Illinois, Indiana, Iowa, Kansas, Kentucky, Michigan, Minnesota, Missouri, Nebraska, North Dakota, Ohio, South Dakota, West Virginia, Wisconsin and Wyoming, but there are plans to expand to Pennsylvania. Menards is the third-largest home improvement store in the United States, behind Lowe's and The Home Depot.

Company history
In 1958, John Menard Jr. began building post-frame buildings to finance his college education. By the end of 1959, he found it necessary to hire extra crews, and to purchase more equipment to keep up with demand. After graduating from the University of Wisconsin–Eau Claire in 1962, Menard purchased land in Eau Claire, Wisconsin and built an office and shop.  The company was founded in 1960 and incorporated in 1962. The first Menards hardware store opened in 1964. By opening a truss plant in the late 1960s, Menards grew to produce more substantial building materials on-site. The truss plant evolved into the Menard Building Division, which produced steel siding and roofing, interior and exterior doors, decking and treated lumber, and other materials. Between the 1970's and 1980's Menards began opening locations in Iowa, Minnesota, North Dakota and South Dakota. The company expanded into Nebraska in 1990, Illinois in 1991 and Indiana and Michigan in 1992. Menards sold the Menard Building Division in 1994, racking up 36 years in the pole building industry.

Menards was founded as Menard Cashway Lumber. In the mid-1980s, the "Cashway Lumber" name was dropped and the business became simply known to this day as Menards. In 2000, the company opened its 150th store. During the early and mid 2000's, Menards expanded into Ohio. 

In 2008, the company expanded into Missouri. In 2009, Menards opened its first Wyoming location in Casper. Then it was followed by another location in Gillette and one more in Cheyenne. In 2011, the company expanded into Kansas. In 2012, Menards opened its first Kentucky location in Owensboro. Four more locations opened in Kentucky, one in Louisville, another in Paducah, another in Elizabethtown and the last one in Florence. Two more locations are coming to Kentucky: Bowling Green and Richmond.

In 2020, Menards expanded into West Virginia, opening three locations in that state: one in Wheeling, another in Morgantown, and the last one in Huntington. In 2022, Menards announced that they will open a fourth West Virginia store in Bridgeport. Then there will be a fifth Menards in West Virginia in Parkersburg, followed by a sixth location in Charleston.

A fifth manufacturing and distribution center in Ravenna, Ohio began construction in Spring 2022 after a two-year-long delay. The distribution center in Ravenna will supplement the chain's expansion into Northeast Ohio and Western Pennsylvania. Four more Ohio locations are currently in the works: Granger, Zanesville, Youngstown, and Aurora. Menards announced in 2022 that it will expand to Pennsylvania for the first time, starting with Washington. A second Menards in Uniontown has been delayed.  In 2023, Menards announced it would open its first Joplin, Missouri location.

Groceries

At such locations, shoppers are able to purchase items such as frozen pizza, milk, eggs, common snacks, and a variety of canned items. In addition, these Menards locations carry items such as office supplies, pet supplies, and mattresses.

Advertising
Menards publishes weekly print ads and broadcasts TV and radio ads. Radio and TV ads are usually accompanied by banjo music (resembling that of bluegrass music) played by Gary Shaw of Wisconsin. Ray Szmanda was the "Menards Guy" who used the slogan "Save big money at Menards" regularly on television advertisements from 1976 to 1998, and occasionally from 1999 until his death in 2018. Before his return in 1999, Kim Larsen took over his position in his absence. During the Christmas and holiday season, radio and television ads typically feature an alternate jingle "Warm season's greetings to you all from Menards!" sung by a female chorus beginning in 1986. The same year, the "Helping You Build America’s Heartland" jingle was made. Bob Holtan, John Menard's friend and radio station owner, wrote the lyrics to the "Save Big Money" jingle in the early 1970s.

Spanish language commercials (whose music contains a mixture of mariachi and banjo sounds) end with "¡Ganar mucho dinero en Menards!"

Auto racing

John Menard got involved in Indycar racing in the early 1980s working with his neighbor, driver Herm Johnson. Menard eventually owned cars, primarily focusing on the Indianapolis 500 often using stock block Buick V6 engines.  When Buick left the sport, Menard bought the engine tooling from Buick and began producing the engines under the Menard V6 name.  Driver Scott Brayton won two consecutive Indy 500 poles for Menard, but was killed in a practice crash before the 1996 500. Tony Stewart got his first Indy 500 starts for Menard, and in 1992 Al Unser Sr. scored the highest Indy 500 finish for the team (3rd) and the highest ever 500 finish for the Buick/Menard V6 engine.
Menards has supported several racing drivers, including Paul Menard (John Menard's son) who won his only NASCAR Cup race in the 2011 Brickyard 400 in a Menards sponsored Richard Childress Chevrolet. ; Robby Gordon; P. J. Jones; Brandon Jones; Matt Crafton; Simon Pagenaud, Ryan Blaney and Matt DiBenedetto. Menards began sponsoring Team Penske in 2016. Menards has also become the title sponsor of races in the Xfinity Series and as the entitlement sponsor for the ARCA Racing Series.

In 2023, the Menards and Matt Crafton sponsorship partnership surpassed STP and Richard Petty as NASCAR's longest-tenured driver/sponsorship relationship.

Industry rankings 
In 2021, Menards ranked 26th on Forbes’ list of "America's Largest Private Companies", with an estimated revenue of US$11.8 billion. In 2022, Menards ranked 34th on the National Retail Federation's list of "100 Top Retailers".

In 2022, Menards ranked second in a J.D. Power survey in customer satisfaction among home improvement retail stores.

In 2022, Menards ranked 28th  on Forbes' list of "America's Largest Private Companies" with an estimated revenue of US$ 13 billion.

Controversies 

According to  Milwaukee Magazine in 2007, Menards was cited with more regulatory violations involving air/water pollution and hazardous waste disposal than any other company in Wisconsin. It also alleges that the company is strongly anti-union, to the point that it will not hire anyone who has ever worked in a union shop, even if they did so while in their teen years.

During the COVID-19 pandemic, Michigan's Attorney General Dana Nessel sent Menards a cease and desist letter citing 18 complaints from consumers in regards to price gouging on products such as face masks and bleach. "Big box stores are not immune to the Michigan Consumer Protection Act or the Governor's Executive Order", Nessel said. "Large corporations must also play by the rules, and my office will work diligently to ensure this state's consumers are treated fairly and not abused by businesses seeking to unlawfully jack prices up to line their pockets with profits at the expense of the public during this time of great need."  Nessel said that Menards would have 10 days to respond to the letter, or she would potentially take legal action.

During the pandemic, Menards instituted a policy that prohibited children under age 16 and non-service animals in stores, to the frustration of single parents who do not have other childcare options. The policy for children was later relaxed.

References

External links

 Official website

Hardware stores of the United States
Home improvement retailers of the United States
Companies based in Eau Claire, Wisconsin
American companies established in 1960
Retail companies established in 1960
Retail companies based in Wisconsin
1960 establishments in Wisconsin
Economy of the Midwestern United States
Privately held companies based in Wisconsin